Nikola Vujanac (born 22 June 1991) is a Serbian footballer who plays as a goalkeeper for Novi Pazar.

Career
In 2017, Vujanac signed for Macedonian side Akademija Pandev, where he only conceded 1 goal out of 8 penalties. In 2019,  Vujanac signed for Radnik (Surdulica) in Serbia, where he made 4 appearances and scored 0 goals. On 26 September 2019, he debuted for Radnik (Surdulica) during a 3-2 win over Trayal. Before the second half of 2019–20, Vujanac signed for Bosnia and Herzegovina club Zvijezda 09. In 2020, he signed for Maziya in the Maldives, helping them win the league. In 2021, he signed for Serbian top flight team Novi Pazar.

References

External links
 

Expatriate footballers in North Macedonia
Expatriate footballers in the Maldives
Living people
Macedonian First Football League players
Association football goalkeepers
Serbian footballers
Serbian expatriate sportspeople in North Macedonia
Premier League of Bosnia and Herzegovina players
FK Novi Pazar players
FK Zvijezda 09 players
Serbian First League players
Maziya S&RC players
FK Radnik Surdulica players
FK Belasica players
FK Sileks players
Akademija Pandev players
FK Dinamo Vranje players
Serbian expatriate sportspeople in Bosnia and Herzegovina
Serbian expatriate footballers
Expatriate footballers in Bosnia and Herzegovina
Sportspeople from Kraljevo
1991 births